Remise may refer to:

Remise (architecture)
Remise (fencing)